The 2017 Yukon Men's Curling Championship was held January 12 to 15 at the Whitehorse Curling Club in Whitehorse, Yukon. The winning Jon Solberg team represented the Yukon at the 2017 Tim Hortons Brier, Canada's national men's curling championship.

Teams
Seven teams entered the event:

Draw
Following new rules set out by the Yukon Curling Association, championships with 6-7 teams are to have a modified triple knock out format.

Brackets:

Playoffs
Pierce had to be beaten twice

Game #1
Sunday, January 16, 9:00 am

Game #2
Sunday, January 16, 3:00 pm

References

External links
Results

2017 Tim Hortons Brier
Men's Curling Championship, 2017
Sport in Whitehorse
Men's Curling Championship
January 2017 sports events in Canada